Syla Moiseevich Mishchenko (Russian: Сила Моисеевич Мищенко; 1897 — 1941) was an Imperial Russian military officer and Soviet general from Ukraine. He played a key role during the 1918 January Uprising in Kiev by supporting the Bolshevik uprising while being a commanding officer in the newly formed Sahaidachny Regiment.

Born in village of Yanivka of Radomyslsky Uyezd (today Ivanivka, Malyn Raion) in a big family of a poor peasant, Mishchenko upon graduating of a local rural school enrolled into the Zabolotyne Teacher Seminary. With the start of the World War I, in 1915 he finished a shortened course of the 1st Kiev Konstantinovskoye Infantry school and as a greenhorn officer was sent to frontlines.

External links
 Profile of Mishchenko
 NKVD special object "Kommunarka". Temple of St New Martyrs and Confessors of Russia.

1897 births
1941 deaths
People from Zhytomyr Oblast
People from Radomyslsky Uyezd
Bolsheviks
Military Academy of the General Staff of the Armed Forces of the Soviet Union alumni
Russian military personnel of World War I
Ukrainian people of World War I
Soviet people of the Ukrainian–Soviet War
Recipients of the Order of St. Vladimir, 4th class
Recipients of the Order of St. Anna, 3rd class
Recipients of the Order of St. Anna, 4th class
Recipients of the Order of the Red Banner